Woodlawn Heights may refer to:

 Woodlawn Heights, Bronx
 Woodlawn Heights, Indiana
 Woodlawn Heights, Virginia